Presidential elections were held in Northern Cyprus on 15 April 1995. As no candidate received over 50% of the vote, a run-off was held on 22 April. Rauf Denktaş was re-elected with 62% of the vote.

Results

References

Northern Cyprus
1995 in Northern Cyprus
Presidential elections in Northern Cyprus
April 1995 events in Europe